Alpha Omega Alpha Honor Medical Society is an honor society in the field of medicine.

Alpha Omega Alpha currently has active Chapters in 132 LCME- accredited medical schools in the United States and Lebanon. It annually elects over 4,000 new members. The majority of new members are elected in their final year of medical school, but distinguished teachers, faculty members, residents, and alumni can also be inducted into the society. All elections are held at local Chapters. No elections are held nationally.

History
ΑΩΑ was founded in 1902 by William Webster Root and five other medical students at the College of Physicians and Surgeons, which later became the University of Illinois College of Medicine. The impetus for its formation was the generally poor quality of American medical schools and students at the time; Root and his colleagues wished to promote excellence in these groups. They decided that membership in ΑΩΑ was to be based on both scholarly achievement and professional conduct.

Root pitched his idea to nearby schools, and soon the University of Chicago's Pritzker School of Medicine and Northwestern University's Feinberg School of Medicine had set up chapters. By 1912, there were seventeen chapters. As more medical schools became interested, the national organization was able to become more selective in the standards a school had to meet to be eligible.

Root stated in the original constitution of ΑΩΑ: "The mission of ΑΩΑ is to encourage high ideals of thought and action in schools of medicine and to promote that which is the highest in professional practice." The ΑΩΑ motto is, "Be Worthy to Serve the Suffering." Root defined the duties of ΑΩΑ members, as  "to foster the scientific and philosophical features of the medical profession, to look beyond self to the welfare of the profession and of the public, to cultivate social mindedness, as well as an individualistic attitude toward responsibilities, to show respect for colleagues, especially for elders and teachers, to foster research and in all ways to ennoble the profession of medicine and advance it in public opinion. It is equally a duty to avoid that which is unworthy, including the commercial spirit and all practices injurious to the welfare of patients, the public, or the profession."
 
Collections of the society's papers were donated to the National Library of Medicine in 1973 by John Z. Bowers, and in 2000 by Gladys Brill Brampton.

Purpose
The current constitution states that, "Alpha Omega Alpha is organized for educational purposes exclusively and not for profit, and its aims shall be the promotion of scholarship and research in medical schools, the encouragement of a high standard of character and conduct among medical students and graduates, and the recognition of high attainment in medical science, practice, and related fields."

To this end, only those who are considered the top medical students are elected, however the definition of "top" is left to the individual medical school chapters to determine.

Controversy
ΑΩΑ elections at some institutions have been plagued by internal political and racial bias. A 2017 publication in JAMA Internal Medicine found that "Black and Asian medical students were less likely than their white counterparts to be members of ΑΩΑ, which may reflect bias in selection. In turn, ΑΩΑ membership selection may affect future opportunities for minority medical students." This pattern persisted despite controlling for other co-variates such as extracurricular activities. Because "the Constitution of ΑΩΑ gives many degrees of freedom to each chapter for the process of election of student members", election to ΑΩΑ remains variable between medical schools and may reflect the local chapter's internal politics rather than academic achievement. Many of the most elite American medical schools have done away with student chapters of ΑΩΑ, e.g., Mt. Sinai Icahn School of Medicine decided to completely forgo medical student elections to ΑΩΑ in September 2018. There are no ΑΩΑ  chapters at Harvard, Yale, or Mayo Clinic.

13 National Programs and Awards
Medical students, faculty, and active ΑΩΑ members associated with ΑΩΑ Chapters are eligible to participate in the 12 national programs and awards that ΑΩΑ confers annually, which are funded from member dues.

ΑΩΑ Award for Excellence in Inclusion, Diversity, and Equity in Medical Education and Patient Care—Recognizing exemplary leadership, innovation, and engagement in fostering a culture of inclusion, diversity, and equity

Carolyn L. Kuckein Student Research Fellowships—More than 50 Fellowships of $5,000 each with a $1,000 travel stipend to present findings at a national or international conference

ΑΩΑ Fellow in Leadership Award—Three $25,000 awards for active ΑΩΑ mid-career physicians development into future leaders in medicine

Robert J. Glaser Distinguished Teacher Awards—In partnership with the Association of American Medical Colleges (AAMC) four Distinguished Teachers received $10,000 each year, their medical school receives $2,500, and their Chapter receives $1,000

Postgraduate Awards—Ten awards of $2,000 to support residents or fellows with a project in the spirit of the ΑΩΑ mission

Medical Student Service Leadership Project Awards—$9,000 over three years to support service leadership projects that benefit the medical school and/or its local community

Helen H. Glaser Student Essay Awards—Monetary first, second and third place prizes and publication in The Pharos for medical student essays about medicine or health

The Pharos Poetry Competition—Monetary first, second and third place prizes and publication in The Pharos for medical student poems about medicine or health
 
Edward D. Harris Professionalism Award—A $10,000 award for institutions that represent best practices in medical professionalism

Moser Award—A $4,500 writing prize for an essay, written by a physician, that celebrates the life of a physician, like Dr. Moser, who has enriched the world

Administrative Recognition Award—Councilors can recognize the invaluable work performed by administrative personnel to keep the Chapter running smoothly with a framed certificate of recognition and $500 award

Visiting Professorships—Each of the 130 medical school Chapters may host one visiting professor each year to conduct grand rounds and hold various special presentation during a one-day visit

Volunteer Clinical Faculty Awards—Available to all 130 medical school Chapters to recognize clinical faculty in community practices devoted to teaching medical students and residents

The Pharos
Alpha Omega Alpha first published its medical humanities journal in January 1938, The Pharos, named after the Pharos lighthouse of Alexandria, one of the seven wonders of the ancient world.

Produced quarterly, with a print run of 50,000, and online readership of 35,000, The Pharos is sent quarterly to all active ΑΩΑ members, select medical libraries, institutions and associations, and contains articles, essays, and poetry.

Notable members
 David H. Adams – Internationally recognized as a leader in the field of heart valve surgery and mitral valve repair
 James P. Bagian – NASA astronaut and physician
 William Bennett Bean – Internist and medical historian
 Alfred Blalock—Cardiac Surgeon (Blalock–Thomas–Taussig shunt)
 Otis R. Bowen – Governor of Indiana from 1973 to 1981 and Secretary of Health and Human Services from 1985 to 1989
 T. Berry Brazelton - Pediatrician and author
 Maurice Brodie - polio researcher
 Richard Carmona — 17th Surgeon General of the United States
 Ben Carson – Neurosurgeon and recipient of the Presidential Medal of Freedom
 Frank A. Chervenak
 Lawrence H. Cohn – Cardiac surgeon, researcher, and educator
 Charles Drew — American surgeon and medical researcher
 Gerald Edelman — Nobel Laureate
 Eric M. Genden – Otolaryngologist with the distinction of being the first surgeon to perform a jaw transplant in New York State, and the first jaw transplant ever to combine donor jaw with bone marrow from the patient
 Steven M. Greer – Physician and ufologist
 Jeffrey Gusky – Explorer and emergency physician
 Howard A. Howe - virologist, polio researcher
 Rahul M. Jindal - Indian-American transplant surgeon known for setting up a renal replacement therapy program which led to the only comprehensive kidney transplant and dialysis program in Guyana.
 Paul Kalanithi – Neurosurgeon and writer
 David A. Karnofsky, medical oncologist known for the Karnofsky score
 Kenneth Kaushansky – MD, MACP, Hematologist, Dean of Stony Brook Medicine
 I. Michael Leitman - American surgeon and medical educator, Mount Sinai.
 Jerry M. Linenger – NASA astronaut and medical doctor
 Mary Ann McLaughlin – Cardiologist
 Jock McKeen – Physician, acupuncturist, co-founder of the Haven Institute
 Marshall M. Parks – Known to many as "the father of pediatric ophthalmology".
 Robert Provenzano – Nephrologist
 Daniel Roses - Surgeon and Educator, Jules Leonard Whitehill Professor of Surgery and Oncology of the New York University School of Medicine
 Jonas Salk – Developer of the polio vaccine
 David Satcher – 10th Assistant Secretary for Health from 1998 to 2001 and the 16th Surgeon General of the United States from 1998 to 2002
 Harry Schachter - Canadian biochemist
 Robert A. Schwartz – Dermatologist
 Michael Stuart – Sports physician and orthopedic surgeon at the Mayo Clinic
 Dave Weldon – Politician and physician
 Paul Alan Wetter - Minimally invasive and robotic surgery pioneer, University of Miami School of Medicine
 Percy Wootton – Former President of the American Medical Association

Similar societies
 Gold Humanism Honor Society, abbreviated "GHHS"
 Phi Beta Kappa
 Phi Kappa Phi
 Sigma Xi
 Sigma Sigma Phi, abbreviated "SSP", the national Honorary Service fraternity of osteopathic medicine
 Omega Beta Iota, abbreviated "ΩΒΙ", the National Osteopathic Political Action Honor Society

References

External links
 ΑΩΑ national website
 http://alphaomegaalpha.org/latest_issue.html
 http://alphaomegaalpha.org/programs.html
 Alpha Omega Alpha Archives (1894–1992)—National Library of Medicine finding aid

Honor societies
Medical education in the United States
Student organizations established in 1902
1902 establishments in Illinois
Former members of Association of College Honor Societies